Indian Ocean trade  has been a key factor in East–West exchanges throughout history. Long-distance trade in dhows and proas made it a dynamic zone of interaction between peoples, cultures, and civilizations stretching from Southeast Asia  to East and Southeast Africa and East Mediterranean in the West in prehistoric and early historic periods. Cities and states on the Indian Ocean rim focused on both the sea and the land.

Early period

There was an extensive maritime trade network operating between the Harappan and Mesopotamian civilizations as early as the middle Harappan Phase (2600-1900 BCE), with much commerce being handled by "middlemen merchants from Dilmun" (modern Bahrain and Failaka located in the Persian Gulf). Such long-distance sea trade became feasible with the development of plank-built watercraft, equipped with a single central mast supporting a sail of woven rushes or cloth.

Several coastal settlements like Sotkagen-dor (astride Dasht River, north of Jiwani), Sokhta Koh (astride Shadi River, north of Pasni), and Balakot (near Sonmiani) in Pakistan along with Lothal in western India, testify to their role as Harappan trading outposts. Shallow harbours located at the estuaries of rivers opening into the sea allowed brisk maritime trade with Mesopotamian cities.

Indo Mediterranean trade network 
Recent archaeological study has highlighted the growing corpus of evidence supporting direct maritime contacts between bronze age egypt and India via red sea. Scholars such as Gregory Possehl have also proposed maritime activities between Indus Valley Civilization and East Africa. The maritime activity in the eastern Indian ocean trade network had extended to include Japan as early as early Yayoi period (3rd century BCE) as evidenced by the discovery of Indo-Pacific beads.

Austronesian maritime trade network

The first true maritime trade network in the Indian Ocean was by the Austronesian peoples of Island Southeast Asia. They established trade routes with Southern India and Sri Lanka  as early as 500 BC, ushering an exchange of material culture (like catamarans, outrigger boats, lashed-lug and sewn-plank boats, and paan) and cultigens (like coconuts, sandalwood, bananas, and sugarcane); as well as connecting the material cultures of India and China. Indonesians, in particular were trading in spices (mainly cinnamon and cassia) with East Africa using catamaran and outrigger boats and sailing with the help of the Westerlies in the Indian Ocean. This trade network expanded to reach as far as Africa and the Arabian Peninsula, resulting in the Austronesian colonization of Madagascar by the first half of the first millennium AD. It continued up to historic times, later becoming the Maritime Silk Road.

Hellenistic and Roman period

Trade between India and the Greek Ptolemaic Kingdom was started by Eudoxus of Cyzicus in 130 BCE. From Egypt, goods could be sent on to ports throughout the Mediterranean. The Kingdom's opening of Red Sea ports and improved knowledge of the seasonal monsoons resulted in a substantial increase in trade.

The consolidation of the administration of the Mediterranean basin under the Roman empire led to the strengthening of direct maritime trade with India and the elimination of the taxes extracted previously by the middlemen of various land-based trading routes. Trade between the Roman Empire and India peaked during the first two centuries of the Common Era, facilitated by the peace and prosperity that arose beginning with the reign of Roman Emperor Augustus (27 BCE – 14 CE) and ending with the Antonine plague.

According to Strabo:

Strabo's mention of the vast increase in trade following the Roman annexation of Egypt indicates that the monsoon was known and utilized for trade in his time. So much gold was used for this trade, and apparently recycled by the Kushan Empire (Kushans) for their own coinage, that Pliny the Elder (NH VI.101) complained about the drain of specie to India:

Roman ports
The three main Roman ports involved with eastern trade were Arsinoe, Berenice and Myos Hormos. Arsinoe was one of the early trading centers but was soon overshadowed by the more easily accessible Myos Hormos and Berenice.

Arsinoe

The Ptolemaic dynasty exploited the strategic position of Alexandria to secure trade with the subcontinent. The course of trade with the east then seems to have been first through the harbor of Arsinoe, the present day Suez. The goods from the East African trade were landed at one of the three main Roman ports, Arsinoe, Berenice or Myos Hormos. The Romans repaired and cleared out the silted up canal from the Nile to harbor center of Arsinoe on the Red Sea.  This was one of the many efforts the Roman administration had to undertake to divert as much of the trade to the maritime routes as possible.

Arsinoe was eventually overshadowed by the rising prominence of Myos Hormos. The navigation to the northern ports, such as Arsinoe-Clysma, became difficult in comparison to Myos Hormos due to the northern winds in the Gulf of Suez. Venturing to these northern ports presented additional difficulties such as shoals, reefs and treacherous currents.

Myos Hormos and Berenice
Myos Hormos and Berenice appear to have been important ancient trading ports, possibly used by the Pharaonic traders of ancient Egypt and the Ptolemaic dynasty before falling into Roman control.

The site of Berenice, since its discovery by Belzoni (1818), has been equated with the ruins near Ras Banas in Southern Egypt. However, the precise location of Myos Hormos is disputed with the latig Abu Sha'ar and the accounts given in classical literature and satellite images indicating a probable identification with Quseir el-Quadim at the end of a fortified road from Koptos on the Nile. The Quseir el-Quadim site has further been associated with Myos Hormos following the excavations at el-Zerqa, halfway along the route, which have revealed ostraca leading to the conclusion that the port at the end of this road may have been Myos Hormos.

South Asian ports

The regional ports of Barbaricum (modern Karachi), Sounagoura (central Bangladesh) Barygaza, Muziris in Kerala, Korkai, Kaveripattinam and Arikamedu on the southern tip of present-day India were the main centers of this trade, along with Kodumanal, an inland city. The Periplus Maris Erythraei describes Greco-Roman merchants selling in Barbaricum "thin clothing, figured linens, topaz, coral, storax, frankincense, vessels of glass, silver and gold plate, and a little wine" in exchange for "costus, bdellium, lycium, nard, turquoise, lapis lazuli, Seric skins, cotton cloth, silk yarn, and indigo". In Barygaza, they would buy wheat, rice, sesame oil, cotton and cloth.

Barigaza
Trade with Barigaza, under the control of the Indo-Scythian Western Satrap Nahapana ("Nambanus"), was especially flourishing:

Muziris

Muziris is a lost port city on the south-western coast of India which was a major center of trade in the ancient Tamil land between the Chera kingdom and the Roman Empire. Its location is generally identified with modern-day Cranganore (central Kerala). Large hoards of coins and innumerable shards of amphorae found at the town of Pattanam (near Cranganore) have elicited recent archeological interest in finding a probable location of this port city.

According to the Periplus, numerous Greek seamen managed an intense trade with Muziris:

Arikamedu
Huntingford further notes that Roman pottery was found at Arikamedu in 1937, and archeological excavations between 1944 and 1949 showed that it was "a trading station to which goods of Roman manufacture were imported during the first half of the 1st century AD".

Decline and legacy
Following the Roman-Persian Wars, the areas under the Roman Byzantine Empire were captured by Khosrow II of the Persian Sassanian Dynasty, but the Byzantine emperor Heraclius reconquered them (628). The Arabs, led by 'Amr ibn al-'As, crossed into Egypt in late 639 or early 640 CE. This advance marked the beginning of the Islamic conquest of Egypt and the fall of ports such as Alexandria, used to secure trade with the subcontinent by the Roman world since the Ptolemaic dynasty.

The decline in trade saw the ancient Tamil country turn to Southeast Asia for international trade, where it influenced the native culture to a greater degree than the impressions made on Rome.

Greater India Hindu-Buddhist period 

The Satavahanas developed shipping ventures in Southeast Asia.

The 8th century depiction of a wooden double outrigger and sailed Borobudur ship in ancient Java suggests that there were ancient trading links across the Indian Ocean between Indonesia and Madagascar and East Africa sometimes referred to as the 'Cinnamon Route.' The single or double outrigger is a typical feature of vessels of the seafaring Austronesians and the most likely vessel used for their voyages and exploration across Southeast Asia, Oceania, and Indian Ocean. During this period, between 7th to 13th century in Indonesian archipelago flourished the Srivijaya thalassocracy empire that rule the maritime trade network in maritime Southeast Asia and connecting India and China.

Chinese travel

Chinese fleets under Zheng He crisscrossed the Indian Ocean during the early part of the 15th century. The missions were diplomatic rather than commercial, but many exchanges of gift and produces were made.

Japanese trade

During the 16th and 17th century, Japanese ships also made forays into Indian Ocean trade through the Red Seal ship 
system.

Muslim period

During the Muslim period, in which the Muslims had dominated the trade across the Indian Ocean, the Gujaratis were bringing spices from the Moluccas as well as silk from China, in exchange for manufactured items such as textiles, and then selling them to the Egyptians and Arabs. Calicut was the center of Indian pepper exports to the Red Sea and Europe at this time with Egyptian and Arab traders being particularly active.

Muslim missionaries and merchants began to spread Islam along the western shores of the Indian Ocean from the 8th century, if not earlier. A Swahili stone mosque dating to the 8th–15th centuries has been found in Shanga, Kenya. Trade across the Indian Ocean gradually introduced the Arabic script, and rice as a staple in Eastern Africa. Muslim merchants traded an estimated 1000 African slaves annually between 800 and 1700, a number that grew to  during the 18th century, and 3700 during the period 1800–1870. Slave trade also occurred in the eastern Indian Ocean before the Dutch settled there around 1600 but the volume of this trade is unknown.

In Madagascar, merchants and slave traders from the Middle East (Shirazi Persians, Omani Arabs, Arabized Jews, accompanied by Bantus from southeast Africa) and from Asia (Gujaratis, Malays, Javanese, Bugis) were sometimes integrated within the indigenous Malagasy clans  New waves of Austronesian migrants arrived in Madagascar at this time leaving behind a lasting cultural and genetic legacy.

European colonial exploration period

Portuguese period

The Portuguese under Vasco da Gama discovered a naval route to the Indian Ocean through the southern tip of Africa in 1497–98. Initially, the Portuguese were mainly active in Calicut, but the northern region of Gujarat was even more important for trade, and an essential intermediary in east–west trade.

European slave trade in the Indian Ocean began when Portugal established Estado da Índia in the early 16th century. From then until the 1830s,  slaves were exported from Mozambique annually and similar figures has been estimated for slaves brought from Asia to the Philippines during the Iberian Union (1580–1640).

Venetian interests were directly threatened as the traditional trade patterns were eliminated and the Portuguese became able to undersell the Venetians in the spice trade in Europe. Venice broke diplomatic relations with Portugal and started to look at ways to counter its intervention in the Indian Ocean, sending an ambassador to the Egyptian court. Venice negotiated for Egyptian tariffs to be lowered to facilitate competition with the Portuguese, and suggested that "rapid and secret remedies" be taken against the Portuguese. The Mamluks sent a fleet in 1507 under Amir Husain Al-Kurdi, which would fight in the Battle of Chaul.

The Ottomans tried to challenge Portugal's hegemony in the Persian Gulf region by sending an armada against the Portuguese under Ali Bey in 1581. They were supported in this endeavor by the chiefs of several local principalities and port towns such as Muscat, Gwadar, and Pasni. However, the Portuguese successfully intercepted and destroyed the Ottoman Armada. Subsequently, the Portuguese attacked Gwadar and Pasni on the Mekran Coast and sacked them in retaliation for providing aid and comfort to the enemy.

Dutch and English period

During the 16th century the Portuguese had established bases in the Persian Gulf. In 1602, the Iranian army under the command of Imam-Quli Khan Undiladze managed to expel the Portuguese from Bahrain. In 1622, with the help of four English ships, Abbas retook Hormuz from the Portuguese in the capture of Ormuz. He replaced it as a trading centre with a new port, Bandar Abbas, nearby on the mainland, but it never became as successful.

The establishment of the Dutch East India Company in the early 17th century lead to a quick increase in volume of the slave trade in the region; there were perhaps up to  slaves in various Dutch colonies during the 17th and 18th centuries in the Indian Ocean. For example, some 4000 African slaves were used to build the Colombo fortress in Dutch Ceylon. Bali and neighbouring islands supplied regional networks with  slaves 1620–1830. Indian and Chinese slave traders supplied Dutch Indonesia with perhaps  slaves during 17th and 18th centuries.

The East India Company (EIC) was established during the same period and in 1622 one of its ships carried slaves from the Coromandel Coast to Dutch East Indies. The EIC mostly traded in African slaves but also some Asian slaves purchased from Indian, Indonesian and Chinese slave traders. The French established colonies on the islands of Réunion and Mauritius in 1721; by 1735 some 7,200 slaves populated the Mascarene Islands, a number which had reached  in 1807. The British captured the islands in 1810, however, and because the British had prohibited the slave trade in 1807 a system of clandestine slave trade developed to bring slaves to French planters on the islands; in all – slaves were deported to the Mascarane Islands from 1670 until 1848.

In all, Europeans traders deported – slaves within the Indian Ocean between 1500 and 1850 and almost that same amount were deported from the Indian Ocean to the Americas during the same period. Slave trade in the Indian Ocean was, nevertheless, very limited compared to  slaves deported across the Atlantic.

See also

References

Sources
 
 

 
26th-century BC establishments
 Trade
History of international trade
Trade routes
Economic history of Tamil Nadu
Tamilakam